Martin Harris may refer to:

 Martin Harris (academic) (born 1944), British academic and former Vice-Chancellor
 Martin Harris (footballer) (born 1955), English footballer
 Martin Harris (Latter Day Saints) (1783–1875), American Latter-day Saint
 Martin Harris (swimmer) (born 1969), English  backstroke swimmer
 Martin Henderson Harris (1820–1889), Mormon pioneer, LDS Church leader

See also
 Harris Martin (1865–1903), African-American boxer